Dominic Larocque (born July 30, 1987) is a Canadian ice sledge hockey player.

Life and career
Larocque was born in  Salaberry-de-Valleyfield, Quebec and lists his hometown as Quebec City. Larocque served in Afghanistan with the Canadian Forces and had his left leg amputated above the knee as a result as injuries sustained while serving near the Panjwayi District when an improvised explosive device exploded under a vehicle he was riding in. He began playing sledge hockey in 2009 in Montreal. Larocque won a gold medal with Team Canada at the 2013 IPC Ice Sledge Hockey World Championships in Goyang, Korea, and a bronze medal at the 2014 Winter Paralympics in Sochi, Russia.

References

External links 
 
 

1987 births
Living people
Canadian sledge hockey players
Paralympic sledge hockey players of Canada
Paralympic silver medalists for Canada
Paralympic bronze medalists for Canada
Ice sledge hockey players at the 2010 Winter Paralympics
Ice sledge hockey players at the 2014 Winter Paralympics
Para ice hockey players at the 2018 Winter Paralympics
Para ice hockey players at the 2022 Winter Paralympics
Medalists at the 2014 Winter Paralympics
Medalists at the 2018 Winter Paralympics
Medalists at the 2022 Winter Paralympics
Sportspeople from Salaberry-de-Valleyfield
Paralympic medalists in sledge hockey